Volkan Dikmen (born 14 October 1991, in Berlin) is a Turkish footballer who plays for CFC Hertha 06.

He started his playing career in Hertha BSC's youth team and joined the second team during 2009. Dikmen was linked with moves to Istanbul sides Galatasaray and Fenerbahçe, but signed a 1.5 year contract with Kayserispor in January 2010. Dikmen made his professional debut as a second-half substitute in a league match against Eskişehirspor on 14 March 2010.

References

External links
Volkan Dikmen official website
Kicker.de profile
Guardian Football Stats
Volkan Dikmen at Fupa

1991 births
Living people
Turkish footballers
Turkey youth international footballers
Kayserispor footballers
Kardemir Karabükspor footballers

Association football defenders